Hisonotus maculipinnis is a species of catfish in the family Loricariidae. It is native to South America, where it occurs in the basins of the Río de la Plata, the Paraguay River, and the Paraná River. The species reaches 4 cm (1.6 inches) SL.

References 

Otothyrinae
Fish described in 1912